Bonnetia holostyla is a species of flowering plant in the Bonnetiaceae family. It is found only in Colombia.

References

Vulnerable plants
holostyla
Endemic flora of Colombia
Taxonomy articles created by Polbot